Janta Havaldar is a 1979 Indian Hindi-language film directed by Mehmood, with Rajesh Khanna playing the title role,  paired opposite Yogita Bali. The film has Ashok Kumar and Hema Malini making extended guest appearances. This film was not commercially successful at the time of its release. However over the years, the film has been appreciated by the audiences in its screening on television and has gained a cult following over the years. This movie has songs sung by a newcomer Anwar as Kishore Kumar refused to sing for the movie as it had his ex-wife Yogita Bali in the lead.

Cast
Rajesh Khanna   
Ashok Kumar   
Hema Malini   
Yogeeta Bali
Shailendra Singh
Lalita Pawar
Dhumal
Mehmood
Shubha Khote
Kanhaiyalal (actor)
Narendra Nath

Plot
Janta, a naive and simple minded young man  wants to join the police force by following the footsteps of his grandfather and father. He is eventually accepted into the police force as a constable, with the support of his new friends- the police commissioner and his daughter Deepo. Janta unintentionally becomes very successful in his work, meets the blind florist Sunaina and falls in love with her. Janta makes some enemies including Sunaina's uncle who is hiding a secret and is scared that Janta will expose him. Will Janta be able to escape the evil plans of his enemies who want to get him fired from the police? Will he expose the secret of Sunaina's uncle and marry her? Or will things turn against him?

Music

References

External links
 

1970s Hindi-language films